Diana Gutjahr (born 13 January 1984) is a Swiss politician who currently serves as a member of the National Council for the Swiss People's Party from the Canton of Thurgau since November 27, 2017.

Early life and education 
Diana Gutjahr studied business after an apprenticeship in office management (KV-Lehre). She is a board member of the Ernst Fischer AG, Stahl- und Metallbau in Romanshorn, which she is managing together with her husband Severin Gutjahr.

From April 2012 to October 2017, Gutjahr was a member in the regional parliament of Thurgau and she is in a leading position in the Thurgau business association and the association of employers in Romanshorn as well as the local branch of the SVP in Amriswil.

She was selected by her party to replace Hansjörg Walter in the National Council of Switzerland in November 2017 after he retired. She kept her seat in the parliamentary elections of 20. Oktober 2019 with the best result in the canton of Thurgau. In parliament, she works on topics of education and the economy.

Gutjahr is married and has one son (born 2022) and lives in Amriswil.

References

External links 
 
 Personal website of Diana Gutjahr
 Diana Gutjahr profile on her party's website

Living people
1984 births
Swiss People's Party politicians
21st-century Swiss politicians
21st-century Swiss women politicians
Members of the National Council (Switzerland)
Women members of the National Council (Switzerland)
Swiss businesspeople